Gheorghe Hioară (born 15 August 1948) is a Moldovan diplomat and politician. He was the ambassador to Belarus from 2010 to 2017.

Biography 
Hioară was born on August 15, 1948 in the Moldovan SSR. He studied at Moscow State University between 1997 and 2003. In 1997, he was appointed as a member of the embassy staff in Bulgaria and became the Ambassador of Moldova to Bulgaria in 1998. He would maintain this position until 2003. 
He served as member of the Parliament of Moldova and ambassador to Bulgaria (1998–2003). Hioară was appointed to the position of Ambassador of Moldova to Belarus in July 2010 and several months later, he was appointed the Permanent Representative of Moldova in CIS statutory bodies. He was recalled on March 24, 2017. Apart from his native Romanian, Hioară speaks Russian, French, Bulgarian.

External links 
 Cine au fost şi ce fac deputaţii primului Parlament din R. Moldova (1990-1994)?
 Declaraţia deputaţilor din primul Parlament
 Site-ul Parlamentului Republicii Moldova

References

1948 births
Living people
Moldovan MPs 1990–1994
Popular Front of Moldova MPs
Ambassadors of Moldova to Bulgaria
Ambassadors of Moldova to Belarus